The 2018–19 Eastern Europe Cup was a season of the FIS Cross-Country Eastern Europe Cup, a Continental Cup season in cross-country skiing for men and women. The season began on 22 November 2018 in Vershina Tyoi, Russia and concluded on 27 February 2019 in Syktyvkar, Russia.

Calendar

Men

Women

Overall standings

Men's overall standings

Women's overall standings

References

External links
Men's Overall standings (FIS)
Women's Overall standings (FIS)

Eastern Europe Cup
FIS Cross-Country Eastern Europe Cup seasons
2018 in cross-country skiing
2019 in cross-country skiing